Rukmini Sukarno Kline (born around 1943) is a daughter of President Sukarno of Indonesia.

An opera singer, she lived in Rome in the 1960s. There, in the early 1960s, she met and  married the American film actor Franklin Latimore Kline. Their son, Chris Kline, is a journalist. Her husband once arranged a concert for her at Carnegie Hall, and dubbed it Fiesta Mundo (world party).  Rukmini, who is claimed to speak eight languages fluently, sang songs from the various countries around the globe.

By the late 1970s, she was the sole owner of Frankenburg Import-Export Ltd., a Kansas corporation registered in Mexico as a middleman-supplier of steel products to that country. 
In December 1978, Petroleos Mexicanos, "Pemex", Mexico's national oil company, accepted her bid to supply some 93,000 meters of steel oil field pipe, and in March 1979 forwarded Frankenburg-Kansas a purchase order requesting various types and quantities of pipe for which Pemex was willing to pay approximately $5.2 million.

In March 1986, she was convicted by a state court in Houston, Texas, of failing her fiduciary duties in brokering a deal between Pemex, Mexico's national oil company, and the Nissho-Iwai American Corporation. She was sentenced to 14 years in prison and fined $10,000 for misappropriating $5.5 million.

She was not in court to hear the outcome of the trial. A few days later, she surrendered to the authorities, turning herself in before a state district judge in Houston, Texas and saying she fled after the conviction because she panicked and became sick.

She is listed as a contributor to the presidential campaign of George H. W. Bush in 1987.

In July 1988, her appeal against the result of her suit against the Nissho-Iwai American Corporation was denied by the United States Court of Appeals for the Fifth Circuit.

References

1943 births
Living people
American people of Indonesian descent
Sukarno family